Pelinu may refer to several villages in Romania:

 Pelinu, a village in Dor Mărunt Commune, Călărași County
 Pelinu, a village in Comana Commune, Constanța County